Francisco Javier Calzada Vázquez (born 4 October 1967) is a Mexican politician from the Party of the Democratic Revolution. From 2006 to 2009 he served as Deputy of the LX Legislature of the Mexican Congress representing Zacatecas.

References

1967 births
Living people
Politicians from Zacatecas
Members of the Chamber of Deputies (Mexico)
Party of the Democratic Revolution politicians
21st-century Mexican politicians